Chrysochloa is a genus of African plants in the grass family.

 Species
 Chrysochloa hindsii C.E.Hubb.  - dry tropical Africa from Senegal to Malawi
 Chrysochloa hubbardiana Germ. & Risop.  - Zaïre, Tanzania, Rwanda, Burundi
 Chrysochloa orientalis (C.E.Hubb.) Swallen  - Zaïre, Tanzania, Kenya, Uganda
 Chrysochloa subaequigluma (Rendle) Swallen - Angola

See also 
 List of Poaceae genera

References 

Chloridoideae
Poaceae genera
Grasses of Africa